The Bridgeton and Millville Traction Company was a streetcar company in southern New Jersey.

Interurban lines
In addition to trackage in Bridgeton, the following interurban streetcar lines were operated:
 Bridgeton to Millville along the turnpike between the two towns, which the company also owned
 Bridgeton to Port Norris via Cedarville, along the main roads

History
In 1897, the South Jersey Traction Company was sold at foreclosure to the Bridgeton and Millville Traction Company, which was chartered May 3, 1897. The Bridgeton Rapid Transit Company (5 miles) was leased by the B&M.

The line from Cedarville to Port Norris was built in 1902.

Demise
The company ceased operations in 1922 due to being delinquent in paying taxes.

See also
 List of New Jersey street railroads

References

External links
 Sebold, Kimberly and Leach, Sara Amy. Historic Themes and Resources within the New Jersey Coastal Heritage Trail Route (Chapter 6: Transportation - continued), Reprinted 1995. Online e-book version by The National Park Service page updated March 14, 2005, retrieved on August 10, 2008.
 Railroad History Database

New Jersey streetcar lines
Defunct New Jersey railroads
Railway companies established in 1897
Interurban railways in New Jersey